A Man and a Woman: 20 Years Later (literally A Man and a Woman, 20 Years Already) is a 1986 French drama film directed by Claude Lelouch and is a sequel to Lelouch's 1966 film Un homme et une femme. It was screened out of competition at the 1986 Cannes Film Festival. A follow up to both films, The Best Years of a Life, again starring Trintignant and Aimee, was released in 2019.

Cast
 Anouk Aimée as Anne Gauthier
 Jean-Louis Trintignant as Jean-Louis Duroc
 Richard Berry as Richard Berry
 Evelyne Bouix as Françoise
 Marie-Sophie L. as Marie-Sophie (as Marie-Sophie Pochat)
 Philippe Leroy as Professeur Thevenin / Professor Thevenin (as Philippe Leroy-Beaulieu)
 Charles Gérard as Charlot
 Patrick Poivre d'Arvor as himself
 Thierry Sabine as Thierry Sabine
 Antoine Sire as Antoine
 André Engel as Le metteur en scène / Film director
 Robert Hossein as Robert Hossein
 Jacques Weber as himself
 Tanya Lopert as Tanya Lopert
 Nicole Garcia as herself in Deux sur la balançoire

References

External links
 

1986 films
1986 romantic drama films
French auto racing films
French romantic drama films
1980s French-language films
Films directed by Claude Lelouch
French sequel films
Warner Bros. films
Films scored by Francis Lai
1980s French films